Þorbjörn Jensson (born 7 September 1953) is an Icelandic former handball player who competed in the 1984 Summer Olympics.

He then have been coach of the Iceland men's national handball team from 1995 to 2001

References

External links

1953 births
Living people
Thorbjorn Jensson
Thorbjorn Jenssonn
Handball players at the 1984 Summer Olympics